The New York Comedy Festival is an annual comedy festival co-founded by Jarrod Moses and Caroline Hirsch in 2004. The festival is produced in association with Comedy Central, the Huffington Post, and Carolines comedy club located at Times Square in New York City. The New York Comedy Festival is generally held in November, and features some of the biggest names in comedy. The 2015 festival had over 200 comedians in 60 shows and even helped raise money at some of the shows for various good causes. Some of the well known comedians who have performed at the NY Comedy Festival include Bill Maher, Ricky Gervais, Andy Samberg, Mike Birbiglia, Tracy Morgan, Artie Lange, Mike Epps, and Dane Cook.

The event usually begins with the Stand Up for Heroes benefit concert.

After being cancelled in 2020 due to the COVID-19 pandemic, the festival returns in November 2021 with more than 150 shows.

References

External links
 

Comedy festivals in the United States
Festivals in New York City
Festivals established in 2004